A monumental brass is a type of engraved sepulchral memorial found through Western Europe, which in the 13th century began to partially take the place of three-dimensional monuments and effigies carved in stone or wood. Made of hard latten or sheet brass, let into the pavement, and thus forming no obstruction in the space required for the services of the church, they speedily came into general use, and continued to be a favourite style of sepulchral memorial for three centuries.

In Europe

Besides their great value as historical monuments, monumental brasses are interesting as authentic contemporary evidence of the varieties of armour and costume, or the peculiarities of palaeography and heraldic designs, and they are often the only authoritative records of the intricate details of family history. Although the intrinsic value of the metal has unfortunately contributed to the wholesale spoliation of these interesting monuments, they are still found in remarkable profusion in England, and they were at one time equally common in France, Germany and the Low Countries. In France, however, those that survived the troubles of the 16th century were totally swept away during the Reign of Terror, and almost the only evidence of their existence is now supplied by the collection of drawings bequeathed by Richard Gough to the Bodleian Library.

Only two or three examples, and these of late date, are known in Scotland, among which are the memorials of Alexander Cockburn (1564) at Ormiston, east of Edinburgh; of the regent Murray (1569) in the collegiate church of St Giles, Edinburgh; and of the Minto family (1605) in the south aisle of the nave of Glasgow Cathedral. The Earl of Moray had been assassinated, and his monumental brass carries the Moray arms and figures representing Religion and Justice.

The fine memorials of the royal house of Saxony in the cathedrals of Meissen and Freiberg are the most artistic and striking brasses in Germany. Among the 13th-century examples existing in German churches are the full-length memorials of Yso von Welpe, Prince-Bishop of Verden (1231), and of Bernard, bishop of Paderborn (1340). Many fine Flemish specimens exist in Belgium, especially at Bruges.

In England
The majority of extant memorial brasses are now found in England, where it is calculated that there may be about 4,000 still remaining in various churches. They are most abundant in the eastern counties, and this fact has been frequently adduced in support of the opinion that they were of Flemish manufacture. But at the time sepulchral brasses were most often fashioned, the eastern counties of England were a centre of commercial activity and wealth, and there are numerous engraved memorials of civilians and prosperous merchants in the churches of Ipswich, Norwich, Lynn and Lincoln. Flemish brasses can be found in England, but they are not common, and they are readily distinguished from English workmanship. The Flemish examples have the figures engraved in the centre of a large plate, the background filled in with diapered or scroll work, and the inscription placed round the edge of the plate. The English examples have the figures cut out to the outline and inserted in corresponding cavities in the slab, the darker colour of the stone serving as a background. This is not an invariable distinction, however, as figure-brasses of Flemish origin are found both at Bruges and in England. But the character of the engraving is constant, the Flemish work being more florid in design, the lines shallower, and the broad lines cut with a chisel-pointed tool instead of the lozenge-shaped burin. The brass of Robert Hallum, bishop of Salisbury, the envoy of King Henry V to the Council of Constance, who died and was interred there in 1416, precisely resembles the brasses of England in the details which distinguish them from styles elsewhere in Europe. 

No surviving brasses in England can be dated earlier than the late 13th century. Early examples that do survive include a fragment from the brass to Bishop Thomas de Cantilupe (d. 1282) in Hereford Cathedral; and brasses to Margaret de Camoys (d. 1310) at Trotton, West Sussex; Joan de Cobham (c. 1310) at Cobham, Kent; Archbishop William Greenfield (d. 1315) in York Minster; Sir William de Setvans (c. 1323) at Chartham, Kent; and Sir Roger de Trumpington (c. 1326) in Trumpington, Cambridgeshire. The life-sized brass of Sir John d'Aubernon II (d. 1277) at St Mary's Church, Stoke d'Abernon in Surrey has the decorations of the shield filled in with a species of enamel. Other examples of this occur, and the probability is that, in most cases, the lines of the engraving were filled with colouring matter, though brass would scarcely bear the heat requisite to fuse the ordinary enamels. Like three-dimensional effigies of the same period in stone and wood, several early 14th-century military brasses (including those of Setvans, Trumpington and d'Aubernon mentioned above) depict their subjects with crossed legs, but there is no substance to the long-established myth that this pose identifies the deceased as a crusader.

Brasses become more numerous through the 14th century, and present great variety in their details. A good example is that of Nicholas Lord Burnell (d. 1382) in the church of Acton Burnell, Shropshire. In the 15th century the design and execution of monumental brasses had attained their highest excellence. The beautiful brass of Thomas de Beauchamp, 12th Earl of Warwick (d. 1401), and his wife Margaret, which formerly covered the tomb in St Mary's church, Warwick, is a striking example. One of the best specimens of plate armour is that of Sir Robert Stantoun (1458) in Castle Donington church, Leicestershire, and one of the finest existing brasses of ecclesiastics is that of Thomas de la Mare, Abbot of St Albans Abbey from 1349 to 1396. An interesting monumental brass of John Rudying dated 1481 in the Church of St Andrew in Biggleswade shows the figure of Death about to strike Archdeacon Rudying with a spear.

It is only in the 16th century that the engraved representations become portraits. Previous to that period the features were invariably represented conventionally, though sometimes personal peculiarities were added. A large number of brasses in England are palimpsests, the back of an ancient brass having been engraved for the more recent memorial. Thus a brass commemorative of Margaret Bulstrode (1540) at Hedgerley in Buckinghamshire, on being removed from its position, was discovered to have been previously the memorial of Thomas Totyngton, abbot of St Edmundsbury (1312). The abbey was only surrendered to Henry VIII in 1539, so that before the year was out the work of spoliation had begun, and the abbot's brass had been removed and re-engraved to Margaret Bulstrode. These ancient brasses were often stolen and re-erected after being engraved on the reverse, as at Berkhampstead, because until the establishment of a manufactory at Esher in Surrey by a German artisan in 1649, all sheet brass had to be imported from other countries on the European mainland.

Jamestown Church in Virginia, built by English colonists in the early 17th century, contains a unique example of an American brass. The inlay itself has been lost, but the ledger stone survives and shows the imprint of a coat of arms and a knight in armour, believed to be Virginia governor George Yeardley (d. 1627).

Modern brasses

There was a revival of interest in monumental brasses in the 19th century. Among many other examples, Victorian brasses can be seen at Truro Cathedral (Archbishop Benson), Oscott College, Birmingham (Bishop John Milner), St. Nicolas', Guildford (Rev. W. S. Sanders), and All Saints, Boyne Hill, Maidenhead (Rev. Gresley and Canon Drummond). The tradition has continued into the 20th and even the 21st centuries. Recent examples have included a brass commemorating Earl Mountbatten of Burma (d. 1979) and his wife Edwina (d. 1960) in Westminster Abbey, unveiled in 1985; and a medieval-style brass to Master Thomas de Aston (d. 1401) in St Edmund's Chapel, Spital-in-the-Street, Lincolnshire, unveiled in 2001.

Lists and catalogues
Numerous lists of medieval and post-medieval brasses have been published. The standard national list for examples in Britain up to 1710 remains Mill Stephenson's A List of Monumental Brasses in the British Isles, first published in 1926. It is still common practice in the specialist literature for individual brasses to be identified by place-name and an "M.S." number.

On many points of detail, however, Stephenson's List is now seriously dated, and its cut-off date of 1710 means that it omits all more modern brasses. An "Appendix" to Stephenson by M. S. Giuseppi and Ralph Griffin, containing numerous revisions, was published in 1938; and in 1964 Stephenson's List and the Appendix were reprinted by the Monumental Brass Society as a single volume. More recent lists for certain individual counties have also been published, including a volume on Warwickshire edited by S. A. Budd, published by the Monumental Brass Society in 1977, which was devised as the first instalment in a "Revised List of Monumental Brasses in the British Isles" (updating Stephenson). However, no further volumes in this series came to fruition.

In 1992 the Monumental Brass Society began to publish a new fully illustrated "County Series" for England, edited by William Lack, Martin Stuchfield and Philip Whittemore,  to cover brasses of all periods, and intended to supersede Stephenson. This has progressed county-by-county on an alphabetical basis, beginning with Bedfordshire in 1992, and reaching Huntingdonshire by 2012. (Cumberland and Westmorland were published as a single volume in 1998; while Essex was published in two volumes in 2003.) For those counties that have been published, the County Series volumes are now regarded as the definitive catalogue. Where appropriate, entries retain Stephenson's "M.S." numbers.

Hugh Cameron published a list of monumental brasses in continental Europe in 1970.

See also
Brass rubbing
Monumental brasses of Gloucestershire

References

Sources

Bibliography
 
 
 
 
 
 ]
 
 
 
 
  (2 vols) Vol. 1 
 
 
 
 
 
 
  (2 vols)
 
  (a revised and updated edition of Herbert W. Macklin's Monumental Brasses, first published in 1890, and which ran through many subsequent editions)

External links

 Monumental Brass Society

Monumental brasses
Medieval art
Brass